The Frances River is a left tributary of the Liard River in southern Yukon.

The Frances River forms the drain of Frances Lake. Flowing south, it passes Tuchitua, where the Nahanni Range Road branches off from the Yukon Highway 4 (Robert Campbell Highway). The river valley of the Frances River separates the Selwyn Mountains to the east from the Pelly Mountains to the west.

The Frances River has a length of about 140 km. At the level at the highway bridge, the mean discharge is 157 m³/s. At this point the catchment area covers an area of 12,800 km2.

See also
List of rivers of Yukon

References

Rivers of Yukon
Liard Country
Tributaries of the Liard River